The Isle of Man Steam Railway Supporters' Association Ltd (IoMSRSA) is a railway preservationist group dedicated to ensuring the continued operation of the Isle of Man Railway on the Isle of Man. Since its inception in 1966 the group has provided volunteer workers, acted in a watchdog role and undertaken the restoration of the Groudle Glen Railway on the island, as well as supporting projects on the railway and producing a journal Manx Steam Railway News regularly.

Beginnings

The group was originally one of two (the other being the short-lived Mannin Railway Group which was merged to form the one association within the first few months) formed in 1966 when the future of the Isle of Man Railway hung in the balance, this group provided a watchdog role over the railway until it was eventually nationalised in 1978 when the future of the remaining section from Douglas to Port Erin was assured.  In 1966 however, the railway did not operate any services for the first time in its history which dates back to 1873 when the line to Peel was opened.

In 1967 however the full network (save for the Foxdale Railway which had closed back in 1940) was reopened thanks to the intervention of the Marquess of Ailsa who ran services until September 1968 when the lines to Peel and Ramsey were closed for good.  This was a period of concern for the Supporters' Association but the future of the line to Port Erin was assured and trains ran on this southern line in 1969 and onwards, celebrating the centenaries in 1973 and 1974 with special trains. But in 1975 and 1976 the services were curtailed between Port Erin and Castletown, then Port Erin and Ballasalla and the group became politically active in fighting for the retention of the full southern line.

Following major campaigns that included the Supporters' Association heavily, trains returned to Douglas in 1977 and following nationalisation the following year the group took on more of a watchdog role, ultimately moving on to restore another railway in Groudle Glen whilst maintaining strong connections with the railway into the twenty first century.

Volunteering

In its time the Supporters' Association has undertaken many supportive projects on the railway, from the basic painting and maintenance of level crossing gates (which were controversially replaced with automated barriers in 2001) to more menial matters such as the general tidying up of stations along the line, at one time their input ranged all the way up to providing volunteer operational staff such as station masters and train guards each summer during the 1970s.  However, by 1978 when the railway was nationalised the role of the group decreased somewhat with volunteer-based workers causing difficulties within a government-run organisation.  An ambitious attempt to fully restore a steam locomotive (No.9 Douglas, built by Beyer Peacock at their Gorton Foundry in 1896 and withdrawn from traffic in 1953) was aborted and so after much deliberation of other major projects (and having used some the intended funds to re-tube No. 11 Maitland in 1981) in 1982 the association began the ambitious restoration project of the Groudle Glen Railway which, since that time has been re-opened in its entirety and now operates at weekends and certain evenings in the summer months.  The railway is owned entirely by the Supporters' Association and operated by volunteer labour. Since this time all the volunteer labour provided by the members of the group is concentrated on the railway at Groudle Glen and activities connected to the Isle of Man Railway have been predominantly fund-raising and/or provision of parts, see below. A more enlightened relationship with the management in recent times has seen something of a return to voluntary input, notably the cleaning and maintenance of the signal box at Douglas Station which has been opened to the public as part of annual transport festivals since 2010, the group have also in the past provided voluntary chaperones to escort members of the public around the railways workshop facilities during these periods. A number of works have also been undertaken to stations along the line, notably at Castletown, Ballabeg, The Level and Port St. Mary as well as larger projects including cosmetic restoration of out-of-use locomotives. To date the group remain the only official charitable organisation dedicated to the continued operation and preservation of the railway.

Projects
Since the organisation's inception it has always had a pro-active role on the railway; prior to the nationalisation in 1978 they undertook tasks on the line such as the re-painting of station buildings, tending to flower beds at the stations, upkeep of the level crossing gates, etc.  After the government took ownership the association took on more of watchdog role and ultimately took on their own major project in the resurrection of the Groudle Glen Railway in 1982 but recent projects on the railway have included:-

 Repaint Of Withdrawn Locomotives No.1 Sutherland, No.6 Peveril, No.17 Mannin (1967)
 Cosmetic Restoration Of Locomotive No.16 Mannin (1975)
 New Injectors For Locomotive No. 11 Maitland (1981)
 Cosmetic Restoration Of Locomotive No. 6 Peveril (1994)
 Provision Of Water Tanks For Locomotive M.N.Ry. No.4 Caledonia (1994)
 Re-Build Of Destroyed Wagon M.78 (Mainland Area Group) (1997)
 Unloch Your Cash Appeal For Locomotive No. 4 Loch (1998)
 Complete Build Of New Wagon H.1 (Mainland Area Group) (2000)
 Brand New Steam Injectors For Locomotive No. 4 Loch (2002)
 New Injectors For Locomotive No. 13 Kissack (2003)
 Provision of Diesel Railcar Restoration Feasibility Report (2006)
 New Steam Turret For Manx Northern M.N.Ry. No.4 Caledonia (2006)
 Publication Of Travellers' Companion Official Guide Book (2009)
 Provision Of Chaperones & Guides At Railway Events (2009-2014)
 New Boiler Tubes For Locomotive No. 4 Loch (2010)
 Period Style Seating Moquette For Saloon Coach F.29 (2012)
 Replica Slotted Post Signal For Castletown Station (2012)
 Restoration Of The Level Crossing & Halt (2012)
 Maintenance & Manning Douglas Signal Box For Events (To 2014)
 Restoration Of Four Roads Crossing (2013)
 Replica Running-In Board Union Mills Railway Station (2016)
 Replica Running-In Board Peel Railway Station (2016)
 Rebuild Of Crossing Lodge Mill Road, Castletown (2017)
 Re-Build Of Original Surviving 1873 Van G.1 (2018-2023)
 Adoption & Upkeep Of Ballasalla Railway Station (2019)
 Further Restoration Of The Level Crossing & Halt (2020)
 Further Restoration Of Four Roads Crossing (2020)
 Restoration Of Ballasalla Gatekeepers' Lodge (2020-2021)
 Renovation Of Ballabeg Station & Enhancements (2021)
 Refurbishment & Repaint Locomotive No. 6 Peveril (2022)
 Replica Running-In Board Peel Road Station (Coming 2023)
 Enhancement Of Ronaldsway Halt (Proposed 2022)
 Adoption Of Port. St. Mary Railway Station (Proposed 2022)
 Cosmetic Restoration Of Locomotive No. 5 Mona (Ongoing 2023)
 Cosmetic Restoration Of Locomotive No.9 Douglas (Proposed 2023)
 150th Anniversary Celebrations Douglas & Peel United (Coming July 2023)
 Restoration Royal Saloon F.36 (Proposals Submitted For 2023)
 Restoration Governors' Saloon F.75 (Proposal Submitted For 2024)

The association have also been vocal in their support of the completion of the re-build of the diesel railcars which presently are in store uncompleted at Douglas station.  They attend regular meetings with the relevant government department and in 2003 a preservation policy was put in place thereby securing the future of the line in a way sympathetic to its origins, ensuring that they are consulted when any major projects are considered by the railway's management. Potential projects are discussed at board level on a regular basis ensuring the group's continued commitment to the preservation of the railway and its historical stations and stock, reflected in the proposed items on the list above.

Groudle

Since the nationalisation of the railway secured its future the main thrust of the group has been the restoration of the Groudle Glen Railway commencing in 1982 and the line continues today.  Since starting the project, at which time the line had been reduced to a footpath, the line has been relaid to its full length for the first time since 1939 which was officially opened in 1992, seen the return of the original steam locomotive Sea Lion to service in 1987, the erection of various replica station buildings starting with the station canopy in 1993, and the continuing improvement of the line as one of the island's tourist attractions; this has included the added attraction of visiting steam locomotives, gala days in conjunction with Isle of Man Heritage Railways and popular off-season events such as Santa Trains and Bunny Trains each Easter weekend. In more recent times there have also been Jester Express days, promotions in connection with Father's Day and operations on New Year's Day were introduced in 2011.  Additionally, Driver Experience Days are also offered where, for a fee, members of the public may spend the day on the footplate of a steam locomotive and drive trains.  The railway is now a stand-alone charity and operates seasonally, whilst the volunteers of the Supporters' Association continue to maintain strong ties with the Isle of Man Railway albeit in a watchdog role, and provision of project items.  The group maintains a strong working relationship with the management and attends regular meetings to ensure the development.

Area Groups

At the time the group was formed there was much support for the retention of the railway both on and off the island and area groups quickly sprouted up across the country, with members of the island committee regularly travelling to meetings on the mainland to provide updates, slide shows, film shows and get-togethers.  Groups existed in Greater London, Manchester, Liverpool/Merseyside, Northern Ireland and the Midlands at one time or another but latterly, there was just one, the "Mainland Area Group".  It was this group that were responsible for the building of two wagons for the railway. The "M" class of wagon numbered nearly 80 and were part of the Isle of Man Railway's stock of goods vehicles; by the time of nationalisation of the line in 1978 when the Isle of Man Government took responsibility, there were very few examples left in existence; one (numbered M.70) had been left to rot for many years and was resident in a siding at Santon station for many years.  It was this vehicle that was used as a template for a project undertaken by the Isle of Man Steam Railway Supporters' Association in 1997, resulting in the presentation to the railway of M.78.  This wagon is now part of the railway's historic fleet of vehicles and bears plaques denoting its origins.  Together with H.1 (the next project by the group) these two wagons now form the Troublesome Trucks for the Friends of Thomas weekend that takes place on the railway annually.

The "H" class of wagon were part of the goods fleet of the Isle of Man Railway and consisted of a four-wheel two-plank construction; these had all been scrapped by the time the railway was nationalised in 1978 but in 1999 the Isle of Man Steam Railway Supporters' Association took on the ambitious task of building one of these vehicles from scratch.  Through a fund-raising campaign this was achieved and the wagon is now part of the rolling stock of the railing and has been numbered "H.1", being the re-used number of the first vehicle of the class, long since destroyed.  This was the second project undertaken by the supporters, the first being the building of a similar vehicle M.78.  By the year 2000 the area groups had dwindled down to a few members, too far scattered in location to warrant regular meetings and was disbanded.

The possibility of reforming one of the area groups has been mooted in the past, primarily so a group of enthusiasts may take a more hands-on approach on the railway to further make advantage of the good working relationship that the group now has with the railway's management; a number of possible ideas have been floated and it is hoped that a group of volunteers may one day be allowed to have an active role on the railway once again, as it did in the early years of the association's existence.  2010 saw a return to volunteering when, as part of the railway's Rush Hour event over the May Holiday Weekend, members staffed the signal box at Douglas and provided guides for tours of the railway's workshops and running sheds for the first time in a number of years.

Manx Steam Railway News

Since its inception in 1966, the Supporters' Association has produced a newsletter to all its members, initially a foolscap sheet, later expanded into the journal Steam Railway News which contains news, views, historical articles and photographs.  Initially this was produced on a small scale to limited circulation and took the form of a foolscap-sized newsletter but the format was changed to an A5 sized booklet early on which is the format it maintains today.  The prefix "Manx" was added after national magazine adapted the magazine's original title, this change occurring in 1985.  Apart from a spell in the 1980s and 1990s when it was produced and edited on the mainland, the magazine is produced entirely on the island and reaches a membership of approximately 1,000 usually four times a year but the fact that it is entirely prepared by volunteers can mean that the number of issues per annum fluctuates.  Members and non-members alike may contribute articles and photographic material for reproduction within the pages of the journal.

In 1992 the magazine celebrated its century (one-hundredth issue) with a colour cover, something which had only been seem three times previously, one of those being for the centenary of the railway in 1973.  Since 2002 the outer covers of the magazine have been in full colour for each issue whilst internal photographs and images remain in black and white.  The advent of the Supporters' Association official website in late 2008 at [www.iomsrsa.com] has meant that news can be more readily distributed but as a great number of members do not have internet access, the news is primarily still delivered via the journal, with more general articles appearing on the website, and announcements.  The website also serves as an online archive documenting many historical documents from the railway's history and is expanded at regular intervals to include newly discovered documents as well as photographs and contemporary articles on its subject matter.  From 2009 the quality of production of Manx Steam Railway News was also improved with a greater number of colour photographs and images in each issue, and the upgrading of paper quality which also enhances photographic reproduction.

See also
 Isle of Man Railway
 Isle of Man Railway locomotives
 Isle of Man Railway rolling stock
 Manx Northern Railway
 Foxdale Railway
 Groudle Glen Railway

References

 Redundant Rolling Stock Saved - local news article details support.

External links
 Official Website 

Rail transport in the Isle of Man
Isle of Man Railway
3 ft gauge railways in the Isle of Man